Rodrigo Ronquillo y Briceño (1471 - 9 December 1552) was a Spanish military and noble known for his intervention at the Revolt of the Comuneros, fighting with the royalists. During the revolt in 1520, Rodrigo Ronquillo, chief of royal troops in the area, set his headquarters in Santa María la Real de Nieva, and lost a battle near the town.

He was born in 1471 and died in Madrid on 9 December 1552.

References

16th-century military history of Spain
1471 births
1552 deaths
Military history of Spain
16th-century Spanish military personnel